Kutsal Damacana 2: İtmen is a 2010 Turkish comedy film, directed by Korhan Bozkurt, starring Şafak Sezer as a sailor who returns to Istanbul, following misadventures with Somali pirates and a sojourn in a Buddhist monastery, to do battle with a werewolf. It is a sequel to Kutsal Damacana (2007) and was followed by Kutsal Damacana: Dracoola (2011).

Production
The film was shot on location in Istanbul, Turkey.

Plot
Fikret tried several ways to get rid of the genie inside of a girl with Asım a few years ago. Fikret and Asım's paths are separated after the girl gets rid of the spell of the priest. Later, Fikret meets his friend Serkan in a Buddhist temple. When Fikret makes a wrong move here, he is thrown out of the temple with Serkan and returns to Istanbul. Here they meet with Müjdat and they yearn.

One morning, Fikret and Müjdat goes to a tender to buy some items. They get a painting from here. But this painting is cursed, and the werewolf in the painting passes to Müjdat. Then Müjdat gradually turns into a werewolf and starts to hurt everyone. Preist master takes action and manages to remove the werewolf in Mujdat, but Müjdat dies.

Release

Reception

Box office
The film has made a total worldwide gross of $4,974,673.

References

External links
 
 

2010 films
2010s Turkish-language films
Films set in Turkey
2010 comedy horror films
Turkish comedy horror films
Turkish sequel films
2010 comedy films